Farrukhzad Khosrow V was briefly king of the Sasanian Empire from March 631 to April 631. He was the son of Khosrau II.

Biography 
Farrukhzad Khosrau V was the son of Khosrau II. Since his father was said to have had a shabestan with over 3,000 concubines, it is not known if one of these concubines was his mother or Khosrau's favorite wife Shirin was. Farrukhzad Khosrau also had many other siblings and half-siblings named Mardanshah, Juvansher, Borandukht, Kavadh II, Shahriyar, and Azarmidokht.

In 628, his father was deposed by the Sasanian nobles in favor of his brother Kavadh II, who executed all of their brothers and half-brothers. However, Farrukhzad Khosrau managed to flee to a fortress near Nisibis where he took refuge. In 631 he was brought to Ctesiphon by a Sasanian noble named Zadhuyih, where he was crowned as king of the Sasanian Empire. One month later, however, he faced a rebellion where he was overthrown and killed.

References

Sources 
 Mīr-Khvānd, Moḥammad ibn Khvāndshāh ibn Maḥmūd (1433–1498), Reign of Farrukhzad ibn Khosrau, 1892, Royal Asiatic Society, translated from the original work in Persian by E. Rehatsek.

Year of birth unknown
7th-century Sasanian monarchs
631 deaths
Children of Khosrow II